Leszek Możdżer (Polish pronunciation:  born Lesław Henryk Możdżer, 23 March 1971, Gdańsk) is a Polish jazz pianist, music producer and film score composer.

Life and career
Możdżer was born on 23 March 1971 in Gdańsk. He began to play the piano at his parents' suggestion when he was five. In 1996, he received his diploma from the Stanisław Moniuszko Academy of Music in Gdańsk. He studied in the piano class under Andrzej Artykiewicz. He began his artistic career in clarinettist Emil Kowalewski's band and subsequently with the Miłość music band. The artist has collaborated with film score composers Jan A.P. Kaczmarek and Zbigniew Preisner. He formed a jazz trio together with double-bassist Lars Danielsson and drummer Zohar Fresco. Other prominent artists he has collaborated with include Marcus Miller, David Gilmour, Lester Bowie, Archie Shepp, Arthur Blythe, Tomasz Stańko, Pat Metheny, Janusz Muniak, Phil Manzanera, Zbigniew Namysłowski, Michał Urbaniak, L.U.C, Anna Maria Jopek, Behemoth, Myslovitz, Iva Bittová, Cæcilie Norby, David Friesen.

In 1994, he claimed 1st place at the International Jazz Improvisation Contest in Katowice. In 1998, he received the Jazzman of the Year Fryderyk Award. In 1999, he became the laureate of the Gdansk Mayor Award for his outstanding artistic achievements. In 2001, he was awarded the Ad Astra Award bestowed by the Polish Ministry of Culture and National Heritage to "an outstanding young musician". In 2004, he received the Paszport Polityki Award in the entertainment category. In 2011, he won another Fryderyk Award for best original soundtrack for his album Kaczmarek by Możdżer, a collection of contemporary film music. In 2013, he was awarded the Knight's Cross of the Order of Polonia Restituta.

In 2010, he performed a special music show at the Węglowy Targ in Gdańsk as part of the Solidarity of Arts 2010 to commemorate the 30th anniversary of the foundation of the Solidarity movement as well as the 200th anniversary of Frédéric Chopin's birth.

In 2012, he served as a member of jury at the Montreux Jazz Piano Competition.

In 2017, his opera Immanuel Kant based on the works of Thomas Bernhard premiered at the Wrocław Opera.

Discography

Studio albums

Collaborative albums

See also
Music of Poland
List of Poles
Tomasz Stańko
Krzysztof Komeda

References

External links 
 

1971 births
Living people
Musicians from Gdańsk
Polish jazz pianists
ACT Music artists
21st-century pianists